Winds of Creation is the debut studio album by Polish death metal band Decapitated. It was released through Earache Records subsidiary Wicked World on 17 April 2000. It was produced by Piotr Wiwczarek (aka Peter), from Polish death metal band Vader.

During the album's development, all of the members were notably aged 18 and younger. Drummer Vitek (born January 1984) was 15, bassist Rygiel (born April 1983) was 16, guitarist Vogg (born December 1981) was 17, and vocalist Sauron (born June 1981) was 18 at the time of recording.

Critical reception

After its release, Winds of Creation received mixed to positive reviews from music critics. Matthias Sheaks of AllMusic said "[...] songwriting is extremely solid; even in the first listen, songs such as the manically frenzied "Blessed" and the beautifully haunting "Dance Macabre" stand out and away from the strange dissonance of "The First Damned" and the call-and-response riffage of "Nine Steps."

Track listing

Personnel

Decapitated
 Wojciech "Sauron" Wąsowicz – vocals
 Wacław "Vogg" Kiełtyka – guitars
 Marcin "Martin" Rygiel – bass
 Witold "Vitek" Kiełtyka – drums

Production
 Piotr Wiwczarek – production
 Andy Bomba – engineering, mixing
 Bartłomiej Kuźniak – mastering
 Jacek Wiśniewski – cover art

Release history

References

Decapitated (band) albums
Earache Records albums
2000 debut albums